Lieutenant St John Graham Young GC (16 June 1921 – 24 July 1944) was a decorated British Army officer of the Second World War.

He was posthumously awarded the George Cross, the highest British (and Commonwealth) award for bravery out of combat, for his heroism in rescuing his comrades from a minefield in Italy on 23 July 1944. He was serving with the Royal Tank Regiment, attached to the Central India Horse, part of the Indian Armoured Corps.

Notice of the award was published in the London Gazette on 20 July 1945. Young had been leading a night patrol on 23 July 1944, when he and his men found themselves in an enemy minefield.  He received the full force of a mine explosion, severely injuring both legs.  Despite his wounds, his encouragement enabled the majority of his men to reach safety.  One of them, Sowar Ditto Ram, was also posthumously awarded the GC for his actions in the same incident.

Young was born in Esher in Surrey, educated at Bloxham School in Oxfordshire and commissioned into the RTR in 1942. He is buried in Arezzo War Cemetery.

References

 Kempton, Chris, The Victoria Crosses and George Crosses of the Honourable East India Company and Indian Army, Military Press, 2001, 
 King George V's Own Central India Horse. The story (continued) of a Local Corps. Volume 2 by Brig. A. A. Filose.

1921 births
1944 deaths
British recipients of the George Cross
British Indian Army officers
Royal Tank Regiment officers
British Army personnel killed in World War II
People educated at Bloxham School
People from Esher
Indian Army personnel of World War II
Burials at Arezzo War Cemetery
Military personnel from Surrey